Ireland is set to participate in the Eurovision Song Contest 2023 in Liverpool, United Kingdom, with "We Are One" performed by Wild Youth. The Irish broadcaster, Raidió Teilifís Éireann (RTÉ), organised the national final Eurosong 2023 in order to select the Irish entry for the 2023 contest. Six songs faced the votes of a studio jury, an international jury and a public televote which determined the final selection.

Background 

Ireland has won the contest a record seven times in total.

Before Eurovision

Eurosong 2023 
Eurosong 2023 was the national final format developed by RTÉ in order to select Ireland's entry for the Eurovision Song Contest 2023. The competition was broadcast on RTÉ One as well as online via RTÉ Player during a special edition of The Late Late Show held on 3 February 2023 at the Studio 4 of RTÉ in Dublin. The show was hosted by Ryan Tubridy with Marty Whelan reporting from the green room.

Competing entries 
On 30 September 2022, RTÉ opened a submission period where artists and composers were able to submit their entries for the competition until 28 October 2022. At the closing of the deadline, 330 entries were received. The competing entries were selected through three phases involving a jury panel with members appointed by RTÉ; the first phase involved 60 entries being longlisted after all of the submissions were reviewed, while the second phase involved 10 entries being shortlisted and the third phase involved the six finalists being selected. The finalists were presented on 9 January 2023 on The Ryan Tubridy Show broadcast on RTÉ Radio 1.

Final 
The national final took place on 3 February 2023 and featured commentary from a panel that consisted of former Irish contestant Jedward, singer-songwriter Ruth-Anne Cunningham, radio presenter and singer-songwriter Gemma Bradley and opera singer Celine Byrne. Guest performers included upcoming Irish artists performing former contest hits and former contest winner Niamh Kavanagh performing "In Your Eyes". Following the combination of votes from an international jury (1/3), a national jury (1/3) and public televoting (1/3), "We Are One" performed by Wild Youth was selected as the winner. The international jury panel consisted of former contest winner for Denmark Emmelie de Forest, Slovenian composer and producer Žiga Pirnat, Ukrainian Head of Delegation Oksana Skybinska and British contest expert Paul Jordan, while the national jury panel consisted of musician Paul McLoone, radio presenter Brendan O'Loughlin and presenter Louise Cantillon.

At Eurovision 
According to Eurovision rules, all nations with the exceptions of the host country and the "Big Five" (France, Germany, Italy, Spain and the United Kingdom) are required to qualify from one of two semi-finals in order to compete for the final; the top ten countries from each semi-final progress to the final. The European Broadcasting Union (EBU) split up the competing countries into six different pots based on voting patterns from previous contests, with countries with favourable voting histories put into the same pot. On 31 January 2023, an allocation draw was held, which placed each country into one of the two semi-finals, and determined which half of the show they would perform in. Ireland has been placed into the first semi-final, to be held on 9 May 2023, and has been scheduled to perform in the first half of the show.

References 

2023
Countries in the Eurovision Song Contest 2023
Eurovision
Eurovision